The Texas Rangers 1980 season involved the Rangers finishing 4th in the American League west with a record of 76 wins and 85 losses.

Offseason 
 November 14, 1979: Eric Soderholm was traded by the Texas Rangers to the New York Yankees for players to be named later and cash. The New York Yankees sent Amos Lewis (minors) (December 13, 1979) and Ricky Burdette (minors) (December 13, 1979) to the Texas Rangers to complete the trade.
 December 6, 1979: Doyle Alexander, Larvell Blanks and $50,000 were traded by the Rangers to the Atlanta Braves for Adrian Devine and Pepe Frías.
 January 4, 1980: Larry McCall, Gary Gray, and Mike Bucci (minors) were traded by the Rangers to the Cleveland Indians for David Clyde and Jim Norris.
 January 11, 1980: 1980 Major League Baseball Draft
Billy Taylor was drafted by the Rangers in the 2nd round. Player signed March 24, 1980.
Al Newman was drafted by the Rangers in the 3rd round, but did not sign.
Daryl Smith was drafted by the Rangers in the 6th round.
 February 15, 1980: Willie Montañez was traded by the Rangers to the San Diego Padres for Gaylord Perry, Tucker Ashford and Joe Carroll (minors).
 March 31, 1980: La Rue Washington and Chris Smith were traded by the Rangers to the Montreal Expos for Rusty Staub.
 March 31, 1980: David Clyde was released by the Rangers.

Regular season

Season standings

Record vs. opponents

Notable transactions 
 June 3, 1980: Tom Henke was drafted by the Rangers in the 4th round of the 1980 Major League Baseball Draft (Secondary Phase).
 July 11, 1980: Charlie Hough was purchased by the Rangers from the Los Angeles Dodgers.
 August 14, 1980: Gaylord Perry was traded by the Rangers to the New York Yankees for Ken Clay and a player to be named later. The Yankees completed the deal by sending Marvin Thompson (minors) to the Rangers on October 1.
 September 13, 1980: Sparky Lyle was traded by the Rangers to the Philadelphia Phillies for a player to be named later. The Phillies completed the deal by sending Kevin Saucier to the Rangers on November 19.

Roster

Player stats

Batting

Starters by position 
Note: Pos = Position; G = Games played; AB = At bats; H = Hits; Avg. = Batting average; HR = Home runs; RBI = Runs batted in

Other batters 
Note: G = Games played; AB = At bats; H = Hits; Avg. = Batting average; HR = Home runs; RBI = Runs batted in

Pitching

Starting pitchers 
Note: G = Games pitched; IP = Innings pitched; W = Wins; L = Losses; ERA = Earned run average; SO = Strikeouts

Other pitchers 
Note: G = Games pitched; IP = Innings pitched; W = Wins; L = Losses; ERA = Earned run average; SO = Strikeouts

Relief pitchers 
Note: G = Games pitched; W = Wins; L = Losses; SV = Saves; ERA = Earned run average; SO = Strikeouts

Awards and honors 
Buddy Bell, 3B, Gold Glove 1980
Al Oliver, Silver Slugger Award, 1980
Jim Sundberg, C, Gold Glove, 1980
All-Star Game

Farm system

Notes

References 
1980 Texas Rangers team page at Baseball Reference
1980 Texas Rangers team page at www.baseball-almanac.com

Texas Rangers seasons
Texas Rangers season
Texas Rang